Rudsgrendi is a village in the municipality of Notodden, Norway. It is located on the western shore of Lake Tinn, halfway between Gransherad and Rjukan. On the opposite side of the lake lies Hovin.

In the mid-nineteenth century Rudsgrendi was administratively a part of Tinn, but the area became a part of the new municipality Gransherad in 1860. In 1886 Hovin was separated from Gransherad to form a municipality of its own. Rudsgrendi was located in Hovin until 1 January 1964, when it, together with Gransherad, became a part of Notodden municipality. At that time Rudsgrendi had 21 inhabitants.

Villages in Vestfold og Telemark
Notodden